Bresnica is a village located in the municipality of Čačak, Serbia. According to the 2011 census, the village has a population of 1,295 inhabitants.

References

Populated places in Moravica District